Little Bardfield is a village and civil parish in the Uttlesford district of northwest Essex, England. Little Bardfield is a small scattered village on the southwest side of the vale of the River Pant. A minor road (Bardfield Road) runs through the village and connects Thaxted  to the west, to Great Bardfield  to the east. The parish comprises the village of Little Bardfield and two hamlets: Hawkspur Green and Oxen End, which are all surrounded by farmland.

Little Bardfield's church is dedicated to St Katharine, and contains an Anglo-Saxon tower. In 1774 Sarah Bernard, widow of the Rev Thomas Bernard, by will directed her executors to cut down all the timber in Halsted Grove. With the proceeds of this, they erected a school and five terraced almshouses.

The nave and tower of St Katharine's Church date from circa 1040AD, with a fourteenth century chancel and porch. The interior was entirely restored in 2006 when the integrated decorative scheme devised for the church by G.F. Bodley in 1866 was reinstated. Between 1910 and 1940 the Brotherhood of St Paul, an Anglo-Catholic theological college which trained around three hundred priests for service overseas, was located in the parish.

See also
The Hundred Parishes

References

External links

Villages in Essex
Uttlesford